The 2014 UAE Royals season is the inaugural season of the franchise playing in the International Premier Tennis League (IPTL).

Season recap

Founding of franchise
On 21 January 2014, IPTL announced that one of the charter franchises for the league's inaugural 2014 season would be based in the Middle East. On 2 March 2014, IPTL revealed that the Middle East franchise would play its home matches in Dubai, United Arab Emirates. The team was founded by Ace Ventures, a group of investors led by Sachin Gadoya, co-founder and chief executive officer of Musafir.com, an Internet-based travel agency, along with his friends Sawan Ravani, Rahul Saharia, Kaushal Majithia, Chirag Vora and Kunal Bansal.

Inaugural draft
The Dubai franchise participated in the IPTL inaugural draft on 2 March 2014, in Dubai, United Arab Emirates. Players selected by Dubai were

Team name
By May 2014, the team was being referred to as the UAE Falcons. By June 2014, the Falcons had become known as the UAE Royals.

Home venue
On 25 June 2014, the Royals announced that their home matches would be played at the Hamdan bin Mohammed bin Rashid Sports Complex.

Player transactions
On 25 June 2014, the Royals announced that they had signed Richard Gasquet. On 22 August 2014, the Royals announced that the team had signed Eugenie Bouchard during Wimbledon. A team roster posted by the Royals on Facebook excluded Janko Tipsarević and Martina Hingis who were presumably released following the signings of Gasquet and Bouchard. On 19 October 2014, the Royals announced that they had signed Marin Čilić and released Gasquet. On 24 November 2014, Bouchard pulled out from the competition due to an injury and was replaced by Kristina Mladenovic.

First coach
On 27 October 2014, John-Laffnie de Jager was named the Royals' first coach.

Event chronology
 21 January 2014: IPTL announced that one of the charter franchises for the league inaugural 2014 season would be in the Middle East.
 2 March: IPTL revealed that the Middle East franchise will play in Dubai, United Arab Emirates. The Dubai franchise participated in the IPTL inaugural draft.
 10 May: The Dubai franchise was referred to as the UAE Falcons.
 25 June: The Falcons' name is changed to the UAE Royals.
 25 June: The Royals announced that their home matches would be played at the Hamdan bin Mohammed bin Rashid Sports Complex.
 25 June: The Royals announced that they had signed Richard Gasquet. Janko Tipsarević was later apparently released.
 22 August: The Royals announced that they had signed Eugenie Bouchard. Martina Hingis was later apparently released.
 19 October: the Royals announced that they had signed Marin Čilić and released Richard Gasquet.
 27 October: John-Laffnie de Jager was named the Royals' first coach.
 24 November: The Royals announced Eugenie Bouchard withdrawn from the competition due to an injury. She was replaced by Kristina Mladenovic.
 28 November: The Royals opened their inaugural season with a 29–24 victory on the road against the Manila Mavericks.
 30 November: The Royals lost to the Indian Aces, 28–20, in a matchup of two previously unbeaten teams. The Royals' record fell to 2 wins and 1 loss, and they dropped out of first place in the league standings.

Match log

{| align="center" border="1" cellpadding="2" cellspacing="1" style="border:1px solid #aaa"
|-
! colspan="2" style="background:black; color:#D4AF37" | Legend
|-
! bgcolor="ccffcc" | Royals Win
! bgcolor="ffbbbb" | Royals Loss
|-
! colspan="2" | Home team in CAPS(including coin-flip winners)
|}

Key: MS = men's singles; MD = men's doubles; WS = women's singles; XD = mixed doubles; LS = legends' singles; OT = overtime (additional games played in extended fifth sets); SO = men's singles super shoot-out

Roster
Reference:
  Eugenie Bouchard – injured, did not play
  Marin Čilić
  Novak Djokovic
  Goran Ivanišević
  Malek Jaziri
  Kristina Mladenovic
  Caroline Wozniacki
  Nenad Zimonjić

Television coverage
On 22 August 2014, IPTL announced it had reached an agreement for the Middle East and North Africa television broadcasting rights with Abu Dhabi Media.

See also

References

External links
UAE Royals official website
International Premier Tennis League official website

Royals 2014
UAE Royals season
2014 in Emirati tennis